Adam Clay (born 7 October 1990) is an English professional rugby league footballer.

Clay played his junior rugby for Leigh Miners Rangers ARLFC before joining the academy at Salford. Clay was named as Salford's Senior Academy player of the season in 2010 and 2011 saw him make his first team début, scoring five tries in four appearances, including a double on his senior début against Harlequins RL.

References

External links

1990 births
Living people
Barrow Raiders players
English rugby league players
Leigh Leopards players
Leigh Miners Rangers players
North Wales Crusaders players
Oldham R.L.F.C. players
Rugby league players from Leigh, Greater Manchester
Rugby league wingers
Salford Red Devils players